The Ul river originates in the Kheri district of Uttar Pradesh state in India.

Origin 
The Ul rises in the Dhaka Chat forest and swamps located in the south-east of pargana Puranpur in Pilibhit district. It enters the Kheri district from the north-west forming the boundary of pargana Bhira of Kheri district.

References 

Rivers of Uttar Pradesh
Sitapur district
Rivers of India
Geography of Lakhimpur Kheri district